The Ortler Alps are a mountain range of the Southern Limestone Alps mountain group in the Central Eastern Alps, in Italy and Switzerland.

Geography
The Ortler Alps are separated from:
 the Sesvenna Alps in the north by the Ofen Pass and the Val Müstair
 the Livigno Alps in the southwest by the Passo di Fraéle and the Adda valley (Valtellina)
 the Adamello-Presanella Alps in the south by the Tonale Pass
 the Ötztal Alps in the north-east by the upper Adige valley (Vinschgau).

The part west of the Gavia Pass is also called Sobretta-Gavia Group.

The Ortler Alps are drained by the rivers Adda, Oglio, Adige and its tributary Noce.

Peaks
The main peaks of the Ortler Alps are:

Mountain passes
The main mountain passes of the Ortler Alps are:

History 

The Ortler Alps were part of the Italian front during World War I. In this area, the Austro-Hungarians and the Italians dug in during a trench war fought at altitudes above 3,000 m (10,000 ft) for most of the war. Some trenches are still visible today, and war relics continue to be found in the area.

References

External links 
 

 
Mountain ranges of the Alps
Rhaetian Alps
Southern Limestone Alps
Mountain ranges of Italy
Mountain ranges of Switzerland
Mountain ranges of South Tyrol
Mountain ranges of Trentino